The rating of an electrical appliance indicates the voltage at which the appliance is designed to work and the current consumption at that voltage.  These figures are usually displayed on a rating plate attached to the appliance, e.g. 230 volts, 3 amperes.

The rating of the appliance is related the power it consumes. Power is measured in watts and is the product of volts and amperes.  The example above would have a rating of 690 watts.

Electricity